Víctor Manuel Guajardo Valdez (born 30 August 1990) is a Mexican professional footballer who plays as a winger.

References

External links
Víctor Guajardo at Ascenso MX

Place of birth missing (living people)
Living people
Mexican footballers
Atlético Morelia players
Toros Neza footballers
Atlético San Luis footballers
Querétaro F.C. footballers
Correcaminos UAT footballers
Club Atlético Zacatepec players
Cimarrones de Sonora players
Venados F.C. players
Tampico Madero F.C. footballers
Liga MX players
Ascenso MX players
1990 births
Association football wingers